The Heat is a 2013 American buddy cop action comedy film directed by Paul Feig and written by Katie Dippold. It stars Sandra Bullock and Melissa McCarthy with Demián Bichir, Marlon Wayans, Michael Rapaport and Jane Curtin in supporting roles. The film centers on FBI Special Agent Sarah Ashburn and Boston Detective Shannon Mullins, who must take down a mobster in Boston.

The film was released in the United States on June 28, 2013. It received mixed to positive reviews from critics, who praised the chemistry and performances of Bullock and McCarthy, but called the film’s plot predictable. It was a success at the box office, grossing $229 million worldwide against a $43 million budget.

Plot
FBI Special Agent Sarah Ashburn is an expert federal criminal investigator in New York City. She is disliked by other agents for her uptight and arrogant personality. Her supervisor, who is considering her for promotion, assigns her to a mission in Boston. She meets Boston Police Department Detective Shannon Mullins, who is skilled but loudmouthed, foul mouthed and hot-headed. The two women's professional styles clash horribly during their attempt to interrogate a local drug dealer. Ashburn reluctantly agrees to work with Mullins.

Ashburn and Mullins tail a local nightclub manager to his business, Club Ekko, and place a bug on his phone to get information on a drug lord named Simon Larkin. Leaving the club, Ashburn and Mullins are confronted by DEA Special Agents Craig and Adam, who have been working the Larkin case for months. The women discover a surveillance video in the DEA agents' van showing that Mullins' brother, Jason, recently released from prison whom Mullins had sent him, appears to be connected to Larkin.

Ashburn convinces Mullins to go to her parents' home to ask Jason for information on Larkin. The whole family is angry with Mullins for arresting her brother, but Jason tips Mullins off about the body of a murdered drug dealer. Chemicals on the victim's shoes lead the women to an abandoned paint factory, where they witness a drug dealer being murdered by Julian Vincent, second-in-command of Larkin's organization. They apprehend Julian after a confrontation with the nightclub manager, but get no information on Larkin's whereabouts, despite Mullins threatening to shoot Julian's genitals.

The women spend the evening bonding in a bar. A drunk Ashburn reveals that her foster child's past is to blame for her bad attitude. The next morning Ashburn discovers that she has given her car away to one of the bar patrons, but when he starts the car, it explodes.

Julian has escaped from custody and intends to harm Mullins' family, so Mullins moves them into a motel. Jason tries to join the Larkin organization in an attempt to help Mullins solve the case. He gives her a tip about a drug shipment coming in. Despite Mullins' reluctance, Ashburn calls in the FBI, which discovers that it is only a pleasure cruise ship. Larkin shoots Jason for informing the FBI about the supposed drug shipment. Jason is rendered comatose. Mullins and Ashburn fall out, with Mullins vowing to bring her brother's attacker to justice. They reconcile after arresting several drug dealers as they try to ascertain Larkin's whereabouts.

The women equip themselves with assault weapons from Mullins' extensive personal arsenal, and infiltrate one of Larkin's warehouses, but they are captured and bound. Julian is about to torture them with knives when he gets called away by Larkin. Before Julian leaves, he stabs Ashburn in the leg and leaves the knife in the wound. Mullins removes the knife from Ashburn's leg and uses it to cut the rope binding her hands. Before she can cut the rope around her feet, they hear someone coming and Mullins puts the knife back in Ashburn's leg. But it is Craig and Adam who enter. Craig begins to untie the two women, but as they realise Adam is Larkin, Adam shoots Craig before he draws his gun. Adam/Larkin has been working on his own case from inside the DEA for several months.

Julian returns and Larkin orders him to kill Ashburn and Mullins while he goes to the hospital to kill Jason. Mullins had put her arms behind her chair so she looks tied up. After Larkin leaves, Mullins frees herself, grabs the knife in Ashburn's leg and attacks Julian first. Ashburn throws herself to the floor whilst tied to her chair and he falls. Julian then grabs Ashburn around the throat and threatens to slit her throat as Mullins raises a gun. Ashburn head butts Julian backwards and incapacitates him. The duo race to the hospital to save Jason.

Upon their arrival, Mullins searches for Jason; Ashburn, hindered by the stab wound in her leg, lags behind. Mullins finds Jason's room, but is disarmed by Larkin, who is about to kill Jason. Ashburn appears and subdues Larkin by shooting him in the genitals. Ashburn requests to stay in the FBI's Boston field office, and has developed a strong friendship with Mullins.

Jason is shown having fully recovered from his coma. Mullins receives a commendation from the Boston Police Department. Members of her family are present, and they all cheer for her. Mullins has signed the back of Ashburn's yearbook, "Foster kid, now you have a sister".

Cast

Production
The Heat is screenwriter Katie Dippold's feature film debut. Dippold wrote the spec script on the side while fulfilling writing duties on Parks and Recreation and, ultimately, it sold to producer Peter Chernin for $600,000 prior to even being presented to prospective bidders. Inspired by the buddy cop film genre, primarily examples such as Running Scared (1986) and Lethal Weapon (1987), Dippold set out to write a film in which the leads were portrayed by women. As Dippold explains, "[In] Running Scared, they go down to the Caribbean and there's this montage of them on scooters, and there's a different hot girl on the back every time it cuts back to the scooter. And it just felt like, I don't want to be the girl on the back of the scooter. I want to be the awesome cop doing this stuff."

Despite the success of Bridesmaids (2011), studio executives were still uncertain of an action film with a female-led cast. "There were people suspicious of this attempt, who thought girls won't want to see a cop action movie and guys won't want to see two girls holding guns and we'd cancel out our potential audience," said producer Jenno Topping. "But we really believed, at the end of the day, it wouldn't be about gender as much as it would be about delivering a courageous action comedy with some heart to it."

On May 19, 2012, director Paul Feig and actresses Sandra Bullock and Melissa McCarthy signed on to the film after previously struggling to close deals due to scheduling and payment conflicts. At this time, the film was called The Untitled Female Buddy Cop Comedy.

Principal photography for The Heat began on July 5, 2012, at then-Dudley Square (now Nubian Square) in Boston, Massachusetts.

Music
The soundtrack is composed by Michael Andrews who previously scored Feig's Bridesmaids and Unaccompanied Minors (2006). A soundtrack album containing songs featured in the film was released on June 25, 2013 by Lakeshore Records. Of these songs, the album includes a brand new track entitled "Rock This" by Santigold. Describing why he chose the songs featured in the film, Feig said, "My favorite part of filmmaking is finding the perfect music to complement what's happening on screen. And I wanted The Heat to feel like a party. I wanted the audience to have fun. And since I have to watch a movie hundreds of times as I'm making it, I wanted to use music that I wouldn't get tired of. Every song in this film is a desert island song for me. I will never get sick of them."

Release

While originally intended to be released on April 5, 2013, Fox pushed back the release date to June 28, 2013. The film held its world premiere in New York City on June 23, 2013.

Marketing
The first official full-length trailer of the film was released on October 27, 2012.

Home media
The Heat was released on DVD and Blu-ray Disc on October 15, 2013. The Blu-ray features an unrated version of the film, along with several audio commentaries: one with McCarthy and director Feig; one with the actors who portray the Mullins family; and one with the original Mystery Science Theater 3000 crew.

Reception

Box office
The Heat grossed $159.6 million in the United States and Canada, and $70.3 million internationally, for a worldwide total of $229.9 million, against a production budget of $43 million. Deadline Hollywood calculated the film made a net profit of $61.8 million, when factoring together all expenses and revenues.

The film earned $39.1 million in its opening weekend, finishing second at the box office behind Monsters University.

Critical response
On Rotten Tomatoes the film has an approval rating of 66%, based on 183 reviews with an average rating of 6.2/10. The website's critical consensus reads, "The Heat is predictable, but Melissa McCarthy is reliably funny and Sandra Bullock proves a capable foil." On Metacritic, the film has a score of 60 out of 100 based on reviews from 37 critics, indicating "mixed or average reviews". Audiences polled by CinemaScore gave the film an average grade of "A−" on an A+ to F scale.

Positive reviews lauded Bullock and McCarthy’s comedic performances. Critic Christy Lemire wrote, “the first produced script from Katie Dippold gives her a smart, inspired and wickedly funny foundation from which to work, and she and Bullock enjoy gangbusters chemistry with each other.”

Wesley Morris wrote in Grantland, “My skepticism going in had to do with The Heat being a movie with two female characters that easily could have been played by a pair of men. But these two are like workplace sexism’s toxic side effects. Ashburn is the ambitious professional who lives only for promotions. Mullins is the anti-feminine ballbuster. Nobody likes either of them. And they don’t like each other until they do. This is generic genre stuff with a realish female friendship at its center: It’s a bra-mance.”

Owen Gleiberman of Entertainment Weekly gave the film a grade of B and wrote, “The director, Paul Feig, possesses a highly developed radar for the alternating currents of competition and camaraderie in female relationships. As he proved in Bridesmaids (2011)…Feig understands how women who don’t like each other express their antipathy — in ways both more direct and less direct than what men do. In The Heat, Feig stages scenes like Richard Donner (Lethal Weapon) with a touch of George Cukor (The Women). He has made a piece of smash-and-grab policier pulp that, through the interplay of Bullock and McCarthy, spins to its own snarly/confessional feminine beat.”

In contrast, Mick LaSalle of The San Francisco Chronicle called the film both formulaic and inspired, but acknowledged "the inspiration is in the combining of these two actresses."
In another mixed review, Keith Uhlich of Time Out said Bullock and McCarthy deserved better material, and also criticized the trailer for giving the impression that this was a less funny film.

Accolades

Cancelled sequel and proposed spin-off

Shortly after the film's release, director Feig announced that the film would be followed by a sequel. In October 2013, Bullock stated that she won't come back for the sequel and the project itself was put on hold. Instead, the sequel was reportedly being replaced by a spin-off film that will centre around Jamie Denbo and Jessica Chaffin's characters Beth and Gina from the first film.

References

External links

 
 
 
 
 
 O'Hehir, Andrew. "“The Heat”: Police misconduct as feminism." Salon. June 28, 2013.
 The Heat at The Journalist

2013 films
2013 action comedy films
2010s buddy comedy films
2010s buddy cop films
2010s female buddy films
2010s feminist films
20th Century Fox films
American action comedy films
American buddy comedy films
American buddy cop films
American female buddy films
American feminist comedy films
American police detective films
2010s English-language films
Films about the Federal Bureau of Investigation
Fictional portrayals of the Boston Police Department
Films directed by Paul Feig
Films produced by Peter Chernin
Films scored by Michael Andrews
Films set in Boston
Films set in Manhattan
Films shot in Massachusetts
Girls with guns films
2010s police comedy films
Films with screenplays by Katie Dippold
TSG Entertainment films
Transgender-related films
2013 comedy films
Chernin Entertainment films
2010s American films